Anchali Sirachaya, née Anchali Choppradit, stage-named Aranya Namwong, or nicknamed Piak, (born September 4, 1947, Lopburi) is a Thai actress. She was the runner-up of 1964 Miss Thailand (while Apasra Hongsakula was the winner).

She was the lead actress in many Thai films in the 1970s, often co-starring with Sombat Metanee. She also enjoyed popularity in Cambodia after her joint role in The Snake King's Wife Part 2, a prequel of the Cambodian blockbuster and award-winning film, The Snake King's Wife starring the famous Khmer actress and former Miss Cambodia, Dy Saveth. She then took a main rule in another Thai-khmer film, Love across Hoirzotal, with the Khmer lead actor Chea Yutatorn. Recent films include The Legend of Suriyothai, The Bodyguard, Unborn and The Mother.

She is married to Setha Sirichaya, lead singer of The Impossibles.

References

External links
 
 Partial filmography at Thai World View

Aranya Namwong
Living people
1947 births
Aranya Namwong